Votsis is a Greek surname. Notable people with the surname include:

Dimitrios Votsis (1841–1917), mayor of Patras
Gloria Votsis (born 1979), American actress
Nikolaos Votsis (1877–1931), Greek naval officer

See also
Botsis

Greek-language surnames